Neeli Aankhen (English: Blue Eyes) is an Indian television supernatural series based on the concept of wishful female serpent. The series premiered on 9 February 2008 on Sahara One.

Plot
The story is of a shape-shifting naagin (female serpent) Vaishali, who resides underground, but comes to earth to lead a human life after being blessed with a magical boon (vardaan). She faces many negative forces, but tries to take revenge for whatever bad is being done to her.  Eventually she falls in love with a rich man's son, Rahul, who happens to have an intense phobia for snakes.

Being the sole heir of his father, Rahul is set to inherit the entire property. Hence, his stepmother, Kanishka, along with her son, Vinod, and brother, Dhanraaj, plans to kill Rahul (to take over his entire property) by causing a car accident. However, Rahul gets saved by Vaishali, and falls in love with her, not being aware of her identity as a shape-shifting serpent. He wants to marry her, but the questions remains whether Vaishali ever tell him about her true identity, and whether she will be able to save him from his enemies.

Cast
 Rubina Sasihuddin as Vaishali (an icchadhari naagin)
 Dilip Thadeshwar as Rahul Oberoi 
 Deep Dhillon as Avinash Rana (Rajan's friend)
 Shahbaz Khan as Aka
 Sonia Kapoor as Neha Oberoi (Rahul's younger sister)
 Puneet Vashisht as Vinod Oberoi (Rahul's stepbrother and Kanishka's son)
 Faraaz Khan as Inspector Vivek Kapoor 
 Surendra Pal as Rajan Oberoi (Rahul and Neha's father)
 Meena Ghai
 Tej Sapru as Dhanraj (Kanishka's brother)
 Ashwin Kaushal as Ronnie Rana
 Upasana Singh
 Supriya Karnik as Kanishka Rajan Oberoi (Rahul and Neha's stepmother and Vinod's mother)

References

External links
Neeli Aankhen Official Site on Sahara One

Sahara One original programming
Indian television series
Television series about snakes
Television series about shapeshifting
2008 Indian television series debuts
2008 Indian television series endings